Ruby Rose Aldridge (born August 26, 1991) is an American fashion model and singer. During the years of 2008 - 2012, Ruby Aldridge was the "face" of brands such as Coach, Marc by Marc Jacobs, Valentino, and Calvin Klein. During the 2011 fall fashion week, Aldridge opened four fashion shows which placed her, at that time, 7th in terms of the number of these appearances in a given fashion week. As of this date, she has walked in nearly 200 fashion shows, including for top designers such as Alberta Ferretti, Missoni, Sonia Rykiel, Valentino, Dolce & Gabbana, Marc Jacobs, and others, and has appeared on the covers of Harper's Bazaar, L'Express Styles, and L'Officiel, and in major magazine spreads in The New York Times, Vanity Fair, and in the Vogue editions of several countries (e.g., Italy, the U.S., China, Russia, and Latin America). Ruby Aldridge is the daughter of former Playboy playmate Laura Lyons and artist and graphic designer Alan Aldridge, and younger sister of fashion model Lily Aldridge.

Early life
Part Italian, Aldridge is the daughter of former Playboy playmate Laura Lyons and artist and graphic designer Alan Aldridge. She has an older sister, fashion model Lily Aldridge. She also has two brothers, Franco Aldridge (known as Franco Evans) and artist Miles Aldridge. Her half-sister is fashion model and freelance journalist Saffron Aldridge.

Career

Modeling
Aldridge was discovered in 2005 when her sister, Lily Aldridge, introduced her to the fashion world. She is currently signed at NEXT Model Management, Modelwerk and  agencies.

Aldridge became the face of Coach in 2008, the face of Marc by Marc Jacobs in 2010, of Valentino in 2011, and of ck one cosmetics in 2012.

During the fall fashion week in 2011, Aldridge opened 4 fashion shows, placing her 7th after Arizona Muse, Daphne Groeneveld, Karmen Pedaru, Caroline Brasch Nielsen, Alana Zimmer and Karlie Kloss in terms of the number of these appearances in a given fashion week.

Ruby Aldridge has represented the brands of Marc Jacobs, Zac Posen, Calvin Klein, Theory, Urban Outfitters, Valentino, Carolina Herrera, Nordstrom, Just Cavalli, Coach, Lacoste, and Emporio Armani.

As of this date, Aldridge has walked in nearly 200 fashion shows, including for such brands as:

 Alberta Ferretti,
 Alexander Wang
 , BCBG Max Azria
 Bottega Veneta
 Carolina Herrera
 Chanel
 Chloe
 Costume National
 Derek Lam
 Diane von Fürstenberg
 Diesel
 Dior,
 Dolce & Gabbana
 Donna Karan
 Dries Van Noten
 EDUN
 Elie Saab
 Emilio Pucci
 Ermanno Scervino
 Felipe Oliveira Baptista
 
 Giambattista Valli
 Gucci,
 H&M
 Haider Ackermann,
 Helmut Lang
 Hermès
 Hervé Léger
 J Brand
 Jason Wu
 Jeremy Scott
 Jill Stuart
 John Galliano
 Kanye West
 Kenzo
 Lacoste
 Lanvin,
 Loewe
 Louis Vuitton
 Maison Martin Margiela,
 Marc Jacobs
 Marchesa
 Marni
 Michael Kors
 Missoni
 Miu Miu,
 Moschino
 Mugler
 Narciso Rodriguez
 Nina Ricci
 Oscar de la Renta
 Paco Rabanne
 Peter Som
 Ports 1961
 Prabal Gurung
 Prada,
 Proenza Schouler,
 Rag & Bone
 Richard Chai
 Roland Mouret
 Salvatore Ferragamo
 Sonia Rykiel
 Stella McCartney
 Tommy Hilfiger
 Tory Burch
 Trussardi
 Valentin Yudashkin
 Valentino,
 Vera Wang
 Victoria Beckham
 Vionnet, and 
 Yves Saint Laurent.

Aldridge has appeared on the covers of Harper's Bazaar, L'Express Styles (April 3, 2013), and L'Officiel (August 2013). She has also appeared in major spreads in the following magazines:

 
 10 Magazine
 Vogue China
 Interview
 Vogue Italia
 Vogue Espana
 V
 Vogue US
 Garage Magazine
 The New York Times
 Vogue Australia
 Dazed & Confused
 Vogue Turkey
 Vogue Russia
 Lucky
 Teen Vogue
 Vogue Netherlands
 Vogue Latino America, and
 Vanity Fair.

Music
Ruby Aldridge is part of a band called Texture alongside artist Bozidar Brazda.

Television
In 2008, she appeared in The Young and the Restless.

References

External links 

1991 births
Living people
Models from Los Angeles
Female models from California
American people of Italian descent
IMG Models models
21st-century American women